Rikako Miura is a Japanese water polo player. She competed in the 2020 Summer Olympics.

References

1989 births
Living people
Japanese female water polo players
Olympic water polo players of Japan
Water polo players at the 2020 Summer Olympics
21st-century Japanese women
Asian Games silver medalists for Japan
Asian Games medalists in water polo
Water polo players at the 2014 Asian Games
Medalists at the 2014 Asian Games
People from Yamagata (city)